Sterling Professor, the highest academic rank at Yale University, is awarded to a tenured faculty member considered the best in their field. It is akin to the rank of university professor at other universities.

The appointment, made by the President of Yale University and confirmed by the Yale Corporation, can be granted to any Yale faculty member, and up to forty professors can hold the title at the same time. The position was established through a 1918 bequest from John William Sterling, and the first Sterling Professor was appointed in 1920.

History

The professorships are named for and funded by a $15-million bequest left by John W. Sterling, partner in the New York law firm Shearman & Sterling and an 1864 graduate of Yale College. In addition to financing the university’s largest construction projects throughout the 1920s, including the Sterling Memorial Library and flagship facilities for many of its professional schools, Sterling stipulated the bequest would allow ”to some extent, the foundation of Scholarships, Fellowships or Lectureships, the endowment of new professorships and the establishment of special funds for prizes.” Sterling’s trustees eventually left the university more than $5 million for this purpose—about $225,000 per chair.

The first Sterling Professor was chemist John Johnston, who was awarded the rank in 1920, and was joined later that year by school administrator Frank E. Spaulding, biochemist Lafayette Mendel, and astronomer Ernest William Brown. By the mid-1920s, the endowment allowed eighteen Sterling Professors to be appointed. In 1958, the Yale Corporation capped the number of simultaneous appointments at 27, but further endowment growth allowed this number to expand to 40 by 2011. In addition to currently appointed faculty, a number of former Sterling Professors retain emeritus appointments at the university and continue to teach.

The first woman to be named Sterling Professor was cell biologist Marilyn Farquhar, in 1987. After Farquhar left Yale in 1989, Middle English scholar Marie Borroff and geneticist Carolyn Slayman were the next women appointed, in 1991. Among the youngest appointees were John Farquhar Fulton, made Sterling Professor of Physiology in 1929 at age 30, and later-U.S Supreme Court Justice William O. Douglas, appointed in 1932 at the age of 33. Joan Steitz and Thomas Steitz, biochemists appointed in 1999 and 2001 respectively, were the first married couple to have both held the appointment. In 2021, Michael Della Rocca and Christine Hayes, professors of philosophy and religious studies, respectively, became the second married couple to be named Sterling Professors.

List of Sterling Professors

Current

Emeritus

Left

Deceased

Notes

References

Yale University
Professorships at Yale University
Yale University-related lists